Sweetin can refer to two American actresses:

Jodie Sweetin, best known for her role as Stephanie Tanner on Full house and Fuller House
Madylin Sweeten, who played Ally Barone on Everybody Loves Raymond